Chaturaphak Phiman is a district (amphoe) in the western part of Roi Et province, Thailand.

Geography
Neighboring districts are (from the north clockwise): Si Somdet, Mueang Roi Et, At Samat (at a single point), Mueang Suang, Kaset Wisai of Roi Et Province and Wapi Pathum of Maha Sarakham province.

History
The district was renamed from Hua Chang to Chaturaphak Phiman in 1939.

Administration
The district is divided into 12 sub-districts (tambons), which are further subdivided into 146 villages (mubans). Chaturaphak Phiman is a township (thesaban tambon) which covers parts of tambon Hua Chang. There are a further 12 tambon administrative organizations (TAO).

References

External links
amphoe.com

Chaturaphak Phiman